is a unisex Japanese given name. It is sometimes romanized as Ryou, Ryoh, or Ryo.

Kanji
The meaning of the name differs based on the kanji used to write it. Kanji used to write this name include:

: "completion"
: "cold/cool"
, "to burn", "to illuminate"
: Aphananthe aspera (a species of tree)
: "goodness"
: "light"
: "silk"
: "forgiveness"
/: "dragon"
: "distant, far"

People

Film and television

Directors and producers
Ryo Sugimoto (born 1976, 亮), Japanese film and television directors

Live film and television actors
Ryō (actress) (born 1973, りょう), Japanese model and actress
Ryo Hayami (born 1945, 亮), Japanese actor
Ryō Ikebe (1918–2010, 良), Japanese actor
Ryo Ishibashi (born 1956, 凌), Japanese actor
Ryo Kase (born 1974, 亮), Japanese actor
Ryo Kato (born 1990, 諒), Japanese actor and television personality
Ryo Katsuji (born 1986, 涼), Japanese actor
Ryo Kimura (born 1988, 了), Japanese actor
Ryo Kitazono (born 1992, 涼), Japanese actor, singer, Satsuma Ambassador
Ryo Narita (born 1993, 凌), Japanese actor and model
Ryo Narushima (born 1971, 涼), Japanese actress
Ryo Matsuda (born 1991, 凌), Japanese actor
Ryo Ryusei (born 1993, 涼), Japanese actor
Ryo Segawa (born 1978, 亮), Japanese actor
Ryo Takeuchi (born 1993, 崚), Japanese actor known as Ryoma Takeuchi
Ryō Tamura (born 1946, 亮), Japanese actor
Ryo Yoshizawa (born 1994, 亮), Japanese actor

Voice actors
Ryō Hirohashi (born 1978, 涼), Japanese voice actress
Ryō Horikawa (born 1958, りょう), Japanese voice actor
Ryō Ishihara (born 1931, 良), Japanese voice actor
Ryō Naitō (born 1974, 玲), Japanese voice actor

Comedians
Ryō Tamura (comedian) (born 1972, 亮), Japanese comedian and television presenter

Illustrators and writers
Ryō Azumi (椋), Japanese manga artist
Ryo Ikuemi (born 1964, 綾), Japanese manga artist
Ryō Hanmura (1933–2002, 良), Japanese science fiction novelist
Ryo Mizuno (born 1963, 良), Japanese author and game designer
Ryō Ramiya (涼), Japanese manga artist
Ryo Sasaki (亮), Japanese manga artist
Ryo Takamisaki (born 1963, 諒), Japanese manga artist
Ryo Tokita (born 1969), Japanese-born American artist

Music
Ryo, leader of the Japanese musical group Supercell
Ryo Fukui (born 1948), Japanese pianist
Ryo Fukawa (born 1974, りょう), Japanese comedian and musician
Ryo Kawakita (born 1978, 亮), member of Maximum the Hormone band
Ryo Kawasaki (born 1947, 燎), Japanese jazz fusion guitarist
Ryo Noda (born 1945, 燎), Japanese composer and saxophonist
Ryo Okumoto (born 1959, 亮), Japanese rock keyboardist
Ryo Owatari (born 1972, 亮), Japanese guitarist
Ryo Nishikido (born 1984, 亮), Japanese idol, actor, singer, and former member of the J-pop group Kanjani8
Ryō Takahashi (musician) (born 1985), Japanese musician and composer

Politics and government
Narasaki Ryō (1841–1906, 龍), wife of Sakamoto Ryōma, an architect of the Meiji Restoration
Ryō Kurusu (1919–1945, 良), officer in the Imperial Japanese Army
Ryo Shuhama (born 1950, 了), Japanese politician with the Democratic Party of Japan

Sport

Baseball
Ryo Akiyoshi (born 1989, 亮), Japanese baseball player
Ryo Hidaka (born 1990, 亮), Japanese baseball player
Ryo Hijirisawa (born 1985, 諒), Japanese baseball outfielder
Ryo Hirai (born 1991, 諒), Japanese baseball player
Ryo Sakata (born 1986, 遼), Japanese baseball player
, Japanese baseball player
, Japanese baseball player

Football
Ryo Adachi (born 1969, 亮), Japanese football player
Ryo Fukudome (born 1978), Japanese football player
, Japanese footballer
Ryo Hiraide (born 1991, 涼), Japanese football player
Ryo Kanazawa (born 1988), Japanese football player
Ryo Kobayashi (born 1982, 亮), Japanese football player
Ryo Kubota (disambiguation), multiple people
Ryo Kushino (born 1979, 亮), Japanese football player
Ryo Matsumura (born 1994, 亮), Japanese football player
Ryo Miyaichi (born 1992, 亮), Japanese football player contracted to the 2. Bundesliga
Ryo Nagai (born 1991, 龍), Japanese football player
, Japanese footballer
Ryo Nojima (born 1979), Japanese football player
Ryo Nurishi (born 1986, 亮), Japanese football player
Ryo Oishi (born 1977), Japanese football player
Ryo Okui (born 1994, 諒), Japanese football player
, Japanese footballer
Ryo Sakai (born 1977, 良), Japanese football player
, Japanese footballer
Ryo Shinzato (born 1990, 亮), Japanese football player
Ryo Tadokoro (born 1986, 諒), Japanese football player
, Japanese footballer
, Japanese footballer
Ryo Takeuchi (born 1991, 涼), Japanese football player
, Japanese footballer
Ryo Watanabe (footballer, born September 1996), Japanese footballer
, Japanese footballer

Other sport
Ryō Aono (born 1990, 令), Japanese snowboarder
Ryo Chonan (born 1976, 亮), Japanese mixed martial artist
Ryo Fukuda (born 1979, 良), Japanese racing driver
Ryo Ishikawa (born 1991, 遼), Japanese professional golfer
Ryo Kawamura (born 1981, 亮), Japanese mixed martial artist
Ryo Michigami (born 1973, 龍), Japanese racing driver
Ryo Miyazaki (亮), Japanese boxer
Ryo Miyake (born 1990, 諒), Japanese fencer
Ryo Mizunami (born 1988), Japanese professional wrestler and mixed martial artist
, Japanese motorcycle racer
Ryo Saito (了), Japanese professional wrestler
, Japanese high jumper
Ryo Shibata (born 1987, 嶺), Japanese competitive figure skater
Ryo Tanaka (born 1987, 遼), Japanese hockey player
Ryo Tateishi (born 1989), Japanese swimmer
Ryō Yamamura (born 1981, 亮), Japanese rugby union player
Ryo Yamamoto (born 1984, 亮), Japanese long-distance runner
, Japanese table tennis player

Others
, Japanese Go player
 Ryō Shimamoto, Japanese shogi player

Characters
Ryo Akiyama, Digimon Tamers character
Ryo Asuka, Devilman character
Ryo Bakura, Yu-Gi-Oh! character
Ryō Fujibayashi, character in Clannad.
Ryo Hayakawa, main protagonist of Princess Nine.
Ryo Hazuki, Shenmue protagonist
Ryo Kiritani, Valorant character
Ryō Kunieda, Bleach character
Ryō Kurokiba, Shokugeki no Soma character
Ryo Kurosawa, Battle Royale II character
Ryo Kuroyanagi, Yakitate!! Japan character
Ryo Marufuji, Yu-Gi-Oh! GX character
Ryō Misaki, .hack character, the player behind Sora and Haseo.
Ryo Narushima, the protagonist of Shamo
Ryo Okayasu, character in Peach Girl
Ryo Saeba, the main character of City Hunter
Ryo Sakazaki, Art of Fighting character
Ryo Sanada, character in Ronin Warriors
Ryo Urawa, character in Sailor Moon (anime)
Ryo Shiba, character in Dancouga – Super Beast Machine God
Ryou Shirogane, Tokyo Mew Mew character
Ryo Shishio, character in Kekkaishi
"Tenkasei" Ryo, character in Gosei Sentai Dairanger
Ryo Watanabe, the Showdown King in the 2007 racing game Need for Speed: ProStreet''
Ryō Yoshizawa, a character in Corpse Party
Ryō Yumimura, a character in Ultraman Dyna
Ryō Shishido, character in The Prince of Tennis
Ryō Kisarazu, character in The Prince of Tennis
Ryō Yoake, a character in ReLIFE
Ryō Jikawa, a character in Inazuma Eleven
Ryō Shimazaki, character in Mob Psycho 100

References

Japanese unisex given names